Bullet is the nickname of:

 Bullet Rogan (1893–1967), baseball pitcher and outfielder in the American Negro leagues
 Bullet Joe Bush (1892–1974), baseball pitcher credited with inventing the forkball pitch
 Bullet Baker (1900–1961), professional football player
 Darren Ford (baseball) (born 1985), nicknamed The Bullet, baseball player
 Bob Hayes (1942–2002), known as Bullet Bob, American sprinter and National Football League wide receiver
 Bullet Prakash (born 1976), Indian actor
 Dan "Bullet" Riley, an alias of Dan Policowski, an early professional football player who caught the first recorded forward pass in 1906
 Bullet Joe Simpson (1893–1973), Canadian profession ice hockey defenceman
 Percy Langdon Wendell (1889-1932), American college football player and coach and college basketball coach

See also 

 
 

Lists of people by nickname